Uzi Peres (21 February 1951 – 31 July 1992) was an Israeli film director, screenwriter and film producer.

Early life 
Uzi Peres was born in Geneva, Switzerland on 21 February 1951 and raised in Tel Aviv. His father, Gershon Peres (1925-2011, better known as Gigi) was a building contractor, and the younger brother of future Prime Minister and President of Israel, Shimon Peres; his mother, Carmela Keyla Peres, was an athlete. He related to American movie star Lauren Bacall.

He went to Ironi Dalet High School in Tel Aviv, and then served in the Israeli Defence Force and fought in the Yom Kippur War. After being discharged, he studied Film at Tel Aviv University and the New Sorbonne in Paris.

Film career 
Peres began his career with The Wait, a short 16mm film made in Israel in 1974. He continued to work in France, making three more short 16mm works: Choisir (1975), Cathédrales (1976), which won first prize at the short film festival in La Raincy, and Sans Draps (1977). He also worked as an editor on Frédéric Rossif's film La Fête Sauvage (The Wild Nation, 1976) and television series L'Opéra sauvage (1975-1981).

Returning to Israel in 1977, Peres became a founding member of Kayitz, also known as the Young Israeli Cinema group, with other filmmakers including Nissim Dayan, Nadav Levitan, Rachel and Yehuda Ne'eman, and Renen Schorr. The group published a manifesto in Kolnoa magazine, insisting that they shared no single ideology or aesthetic principles, but were united by their search of an innovative Israeli film language. Responding to the government's preference to support other arts ahead of cinema, they suggested that Israeli films should be produced with small crews and low budgets, but they also lobbied for increased funding for non-commercial cinema, which led to the foundation of the Fund for the Encouragement of Original Quality Films in 1978. He only made one more short in Israel, however - 1978's Hand Exercises, which won a Best Actor award at an Israeli short film competition.

Peres returned to France to make his first feature films: Pareil pas pareil (1978), L'amour mensonge (1979) and Shadow of a Game (1980). The first he directed in Israel was First Love (1982), produced by his sister, Ruth. Here, Yitzhak (played by Hanah Goldblatt) leaves his kibbutz during a midlife crisis returns to his first love, Ziva (Gila Almagor) now aged 40 with two teenage children, with inevitable complications for all involved. His final film, Me and My Wife's Lover, was also made in Israel and produced by Ruth Peres, and released in 1983.

Death 
Peres died aged 41 on 31 July 1992, when he was one of 113 people killed on the Thai Airways International Airbus that crashed into a hillside whilst trying to make a bad weather landing in Kathmandu. He left a wife, Bracha, and three children, Sara, David and Michael. Together with the Israel Film and Television Directors Association, the Peres family established an annual prize in Uzi's name, awarded in conjunction with the Tel Aviv Cinematheque, to the director of an outstanding short film.

A plaque dedicates to Peres at Tel Aviv Cinematheque includes a quote from one of his early films, Pareil pas pareil (1978), which reads: "I would like to be able to turn every moment of life into a celebration, to build memorials to everything beautiful, to all that exists ... in order to preserve and endlessly multiply all that a dream allows."

Filmography 
Director

ההמתנה / The Wait (1974, short)

Choisir (1975, short)

Cathédrales / Cathedrals (1976, short)

Sans draps / Without Sheets (1977, short)

תרגילי ידיים / Hand Exercises (1978, short)

Pareil pas pareil (1978)

L'amour mensonge / Lying Love (1979)

Ombre d'un jeu / Shadow of a Game (1980)

אהבה ראשונה / First Love (1982)

Ani Vehami'ahav Shel Ishti / Me and My Wife's Lover (1983)

See also 
 Cinema of Israel
 Visual arts in Israel

References

External links 
 Uzi Peres at IMDb
 Uziel Pérez (1983) in Gérard Courant's Cinématon project

1951 births
1992 deaths
20th-century Israeli screenwriters
Burials at Kiryat Shaul Cemetery
Film people from Tel Aviv
Israeli film directors
Israeli film producers
Israeli male screenwriters
20th-century Israeli Jews
Israeli people of Polish-Jewish descent
Swiss emigrants to Israel
Victims of aviation accidents or incidents in Nepal
Victims of aviation accidents or incidents in 1992